Marie Gabriel Augustin Savard (21 August 1814 – 7 June 1881) was a French composer and teacher.

Savard was a teacher at the Paris Conservatory in tonic solfa, harmony and figured bass. Among his pupils were Jules Massenet, Cécile Chaminade, Eduard Reuss, and Edward MacDowell.  Massenet describes him fondly in his memoires. His works include the following:
 Kyrie (1860) (Niedermeyer) 
  Messe solennelle (1865)

He also published books on music theory and a compilation of plainsong chants. These include:
 Cours complet d'Harmonie théorique et pratique (1853) and
 Principes de la musique et méthode de transposition (1865), Librairie Hachette et cie., Paris 

The latter work was approved by L'Académie des beaux-arts of the Institut de France under such notables as Daniel Auber, Ambroise Thomas, Hector Berlioz and Fromental Halévy.

He was the father of Marie Emmanuel Augustin Savard.

References

External links
 Image of Augustin Savard pêre on a medallion at the Cité de la Musique

1814 births
1881 deaths
Academic staff of the Conservatoire de Paris
19th-century French composers